The 28th Army was a field army of the Red Army and the Soviet Ground Forces, formed three times in 1941–42 and active during the postwar period for many years in the Belorussian Military District.

Initial formation 
The army was formed first in June 1941 from the Arkhangelsk Military District. It included the 30th and 33rd Rifle Corps, 69th Motorised Division, artillery and several other units.
The Army Commander was Lieutenant General Vladimir Kachalov (previously commander of the Arkhangelsk Military District). Members of the army's Military Council were Brigade Commissioner Vasily T. Kolesnikov, and Army Chief of Staff Major General Pavel G. Egorov.

On 14 July 1941, the order creating the Reserve Front gave the 28th Army's composition as nine divisions, one gun, one howitzer, and four corps artillery regiments, and four anti-tank artillery regiments.

It participated in the Battle of Smolensk. The army was encircled in the Smolensk Pocket and destroyed. Army headquarters was disbanded on 10 August. Subordinate units that broke out were used to form the Reserve Front, along with units from other armies.

General Kachalov was killed by artillery fire on 4 August 1941 during the breakout from the encirclement. He was buried in the village of Stodolische, Pochinkovsky District, Smolensk Oblast. Lacking accurate information regarding his death, Stalin allowed him to be named as a traitor and sentenced to death in absentia in accordance with Order № 270. Only on 23 December 1953, well after the war ended, did the Supreme Court overturn the order.

Second and third formations
The army was subsequently reformed again in November 1941 and September 1942. The third formation began on 9 September, from forces assigned to the Stalingrad Military District and Southeastern Front, and was tasked with defending the port city of Astrakhan on the Caspian Sea's northern coast, as well as the lower reaches of the Volga. The army was under the command of Lt. Gen. Vasyl Herasymenko, with Corps Commissar A.N. Melnikov and chief of staff Mjr. Gen. S.M. Rogachevsky making up the rest of the army's Military Council. On its formation it was under the direct command of the STAVKA, but on 30 September it was subordinated to Stalingrad Front. On 19 November, just before Operation Uranus began south of Stalingrad, the army was comprised as follows:
 34th Guards Rifle Division
 248th Rifle Division
 52nd, 152nd and 159th Rifle Brigades
 78th and 116th Fortified Regions
 A separate cavalry regiment (or battalion)
 6th Guards Tank Brigade
 565th Separate Tank Battalion
 35th Separate Armored Car Battalion
 30th, 33rd and 46th Separate Armored Train Battalions
As of 19 November, the army's ration strength was 64,265 men, with 47,891 men assigned to its combat forces. It fielded 1,196 guns and mortars and 80 tanks (10 heavy, 26 medium and 44 light).

On 1 July 1944 the army comprised the 
 3rd Guards Rifle Corps (50th, 54th and 96th Guards Rifle Divisions), 
 20th Rifle Corps (48th and 55th Guards Rifle Divisions, 20th Rifle Division), 
 128th Rifle Corps (61st, 130th, and 152nd Rifle Divisions) 
 artillery units including the 3rd Corps Artillery Brigade, 157th Cannon Artillery Brigade, 377th Cannon Artillery Regiment, 530th Fighter Anti-Tank Artillery Regiment, 1st Mortar Brigade (from the 5th Breakthrough Artillery Division), 133rd and 316th Guards Mortar Regiments, 12th Anti-Aircraft Artillery Division (836th, 977th, 990th, 997th Anti-Aircraft Artillery Regiments), 607th Anti-Aircraft Artillery Regiment (зенап), 
 tank forces, engineers, and other troops.

Commanders 
 Vladimir Kachalov (June–August 1941), killed in action
 Ivan Tyulenev (November 1941 – March 1942)
 Dmitry Ryabyshev (March – July 1942)
 Vasily Kryuchenkin (July 1942)
 Vasyl Herasymenko (September 1942 – November 1943)
 Aleksei Aleksandrovich Grechkin (November 1943 – May 1944)
 Alexander Luchinsky (May 1944 – February 1946)
 Franz Perkhorovich (February – May 1946)
 Pyotr Shafranov (May 1946 – 1947)
 Nikolai Gusev (1947–1949)
 Ivan Chistyakov (1949–1953) 
 Andrey Matveyevich Andreyev (1954–1957)

Third formation and postwar 
In September 1945, the 28th Army established its headquarters in the Baranovichi Military District. From 1945 to 1947, the number of rifle units were reduced, and their qualitative composition increased.

In September 1954, the 12th Guards Mozyr Mechanised Division and the 50th Guards Stalino Rifle Division, part of the troops of the 128th Gumbinnen Rifle Corps, were used to form the test units utilised at Totskoye during the test of a 40-kiloton nuclear bomb.

In 1957, rifle corps headquarters were abolished, rifle divisions reorganized into motor rifle, and mechanized divisions into tank divisions:

8th Mechanized Division – 28th Oleksandriia Red Banner Order of Kutuzov Tank Division (Slonim);
12th Guards Mechanized Division – the 33rd (became the 15th in 1965) Guards Mozyr Red Banner Order of Suvorov Tank Division (Brest).

In August 1968, the 15th Guards Tank and 30th (up to 1965 – 55th) Guards Motor Rifle Division of the 28th Army were sent to Czechoslovakia to participate in Operation Danube, where they remained as part of the Central Group of Forces.  To replace these divisions, the 76th Tank Division was created at Brest and the 84th Motor Rifle Division at Grodno as mobilization divisions. On 15 January 1974, the army was awarded the Order of the Red Banner. The 6th Guards Kiev-Berlin Tank Division transferred to Grodno in March 1980 from East Germany. To make room for the 6th Division, the 84th Motor Rifle Division was moved to the 7th Tank Army. During the 1980s, the army was composed of the 6th Guards, 28th and 76th Tank Divisions and the 50th Guards Motor Rifle Division. During the late 1980s, the 28th was disbanded and became the 6314th Weapons and Equipment Storage Base and the 76th Tank Division reorganized as the 5356th Weapons and Equipment Storage Base.

On the dissolution of the Soviet Union the 28th Army, headquartered at Grodno, included the 6th Guards Tank Division (Grodno), 6314th Weapons and Equipment Storage Base (Slonim), 50th Guards Motor Rifle Division (Brest), and the 5356th Weapons and Equipment Storage Base, also at Brest.

In 1993 the army was disbanded by being redesignated the 28th Army Corps. The corps was redesignated the Western Operational Command in 2001.

References

Citations

Bibliography

External links
Army history at bdsa.ru

028
Military units and formations established in 1941
Military units and formations disestablished in 1993
Wikipedia articles needing cleanup after translation from Russian
Military units and formations awarded the Order of the Red Banner